Vainius or Voin (died between 1338 and 1342) was the Prince of Polotsk from 1315 to his death. Very little is known about Vainius, brother of Gediminas, Grand Duke of Lithuania. He is mentioned in written sources in 1324 for the first time. In 1328 he, already as Prince of Polotsk, signed a treaty with the Livonian Order and Novgorod. His only known son Liubko (Liubartas) died in 1342 during fights with the Livonian Order.

References

See also 
 family of Gediminas – family tree of Vainius
 Gediminids

Gediminids
Year of death unknown
Year of birth unknown